Bryan Miki (born May 15, 1969) is a Canadian curler.

Miki coached British Columbia to a gold medal at the 2019 Canada Winter Games. He currently coaches the Jacques Gauthier rink.

Awards
Hec Gervais Playoff MVP Award: 2000
Ross Harstone Sportsmanship Award: 2000
British Columbia Sports Hall of Fame: inducted in 2002 with all of 2000 Greg McAulay team, Canadian and World champions
Burnaby Sports Hall of Fame: 2017

Teams

Mixed

Personal life
Miki's father Fuji was the first ever curler of Japanese descent to play at the Brier in 1979. and is a former Canadian Mixed Champion, and is a former coach of the Japanese women's curling team. Bryan Miki grew up in South Burnaby, British Columbia, and currently lives in Port Coquitlam. His son Joshua also curls, and was a member of the 2019 gold medal winning team at the Canada Games. 

At the time of the 2000 World Championships, Miki was employed as a leak survey technician for BC Gas. He currently works as a gasfitter for FortisBC.

References

External links
 
 Bryan Miki – Curling Canada Stats Archive
 

Living people
Canadian male curlers
Curlers from British Columbia
World curling champions
Brier champions
Canadian sportspeople of Japanese descent
Sportspeople from Burnaby
People from Port Coquitlam
Canadian curling coaches
1969 births
Place of birth missing (living people)